means "third one" in Japanese. It may refer to:

 , a Japanese manufacturer of pachinko machines 
 Sankyo Flute Company, which produces silver, 5K, 10K, 14K, 18K, and 24K gold flutes
 Nidec Sankyo, a Japanese manufacturer of music boxes and electronic components, successor to Sankyo Seiki Mfg. Co. since 2005, part of the Nidec Group
Sankyo Seiko Co., Ltd. (三共生興グループ)